SM UC-104 was a German Type UC III minelaying submarine or U-boat in the German Imperial Navy during World War I.

Design
A German Type UC III submarine, UC-104 had a displacement of  when at the surface and  while submerged. The submarine was powered by two six-cylinder four-stroke diesel engines each producing  (a total of ), two electric motors producing , and two propeller shafts.

UC-104 was fitted with six  mine tubes, fourteen UC 200 mines, three  torpedo tubes (one on the stern and two on the bow), seven torpedoes, and one  SK L/45 or  Uk L/30 deck gun . Her complement was twenty-six crew members.

Construction and career
The U-boat was ordered on 12 January 1916 and was launched on 25 May 1918. She was commissioned into the German Imperial Navy on 18 October 1918 as SM UC-104. As with the rest of the completed UC III boats, UC-104 conducted no war patrols and sank no ships. She was surrendered to France on 24 November 1918 and was broken up in Brest in July 1921.

References

Notes

Citations

Bibliography

 
 

Ships built in Hamburg
German Type UC III submarines
U-boats commissioned in 1918
World War I submarines of Germany
World War I minelayers of Germany
1918 ships